Tohto University Baseball League (東都大学野球連盟, Tōto daigaku yakyū renmei) is an intercollegiate baseball league that features 21 prominent universities in the Tokyo area.

Game

History 
Tohto University Baseball League was established in 1930. The league title team has recorded 21 championships in All Japan University Baseball Championship Series.  It is the most championships in the university baseball league in Japan.

Members (Autumn 2014)

Division 1 

Aoyama Gakuin University
Affiliation:1951
League Championships in Division1: 12
All-Time Record in Division1: 429-382-27
Last Championship: Spring 2006
Asia University
Affiliation:1959
League Championships in Division1: 23
All-Time Record in Division1: 653-535-33
Last Championship: Spring 2014
Chuo University
Affiliation:1930
League Championships in Division1: 24
All-Time Record in Division1: 789-622-64
Last Championship: Autumn 2004
Kokugakuin University
Affiliation:1930
League Championships in Division1: 1
All-Time Record in Division1: 182-341-12
Last Championship: Autumn 2010
Komazawa University
Affiliation:1948
League Championships in Division1: 26
All-Time Record in Division1: 815-692-51
Last Championship: Autumn 2001
Takushoku University
Affiliation:1949
League Championships in Division1: 0
All-Time Record in Division1: 14-11-0

Division 2

Kokushikan University
Affiliation:1959
League Championships in Division1: 1
All-Time Record in Division1: 62-130-7
Last Championship: Autumn 1979
Nihon University
Affiliation:1930
League Championships in Division1: 22
All-Time Record in Division1: 757-673-52
Last Championship: Spring 2004
Rissho University
Affiliation:1959
League Championships in Division1: 1
All-Time Record in Division1: 76-130-4
Last Championship: Autumn 2009
Senshu University
Affiliation:1930
League Championships in Division1: 31
All-Time Record in Division1: 699-498-38
Last Championship: Spring 1989
Tokyo University of Agriculture
Affiliation:1930
League Championships in Division1: 0
All-Time Record in Division1: 124-355-10
Toyo University
Affiliation:1940
League Championships in Division1: 16
All-Time Record in Division1: 557-557-27
Last Championship: Spring 2011

Division 3

Gakushuin University
Affiliation:1950
League Championships in Division1:1
All-Time Record in Division1: 66-131-11
Last Championship: Autumn 1958
Juntendo University
Affiliation:1958
League Championships in Division1:0
Seikei University
Affiliation:1951
League Championships in Division1:0
Shibaura Institute of Technology
Affiliation:1951
League Championships in Division1:3
All-Time Record in Division1: 145-174-11
Last Championship: Spring 1970
Sophia University
Affiliation:1940
League Championships in Division1:0
Taisho University
Affiliation:1948
League Championships in Division1:0

Division 4

Hitotsubashi University
Affiliation:1935
League Championships in Division1:0
All-Time Record in Division1: 17-95-2
Tokyo City University
Affiliation:1951
League Championships in Division1:0
Tokyo Institute of Technology
Affiliation:1946
League Championships in Division1:0
All-Time Record in Division1: 13-49-0

Notable alumni

Aoyama Gakuin University
Tadahito Iguchi (1997- Fukuoka Daiei Hawks→Chicago White Sox)
Tokitaka Minamibuchi (1990–2000 Chiba Lotte Marines→Chunichi Dragons→Orix Bluewave)
Tomochika Tsuboi (1998- Hanshin Tigers→Nippon Ham Fighters)
Hidetaka Kawagoe (1999- Orix Bluewave, Orix Buffaloes)
Hiroki Kokubo (1994- Fukuoka Daiei Hawks→Yomiuri Giants→Fukuoka SoftBank Hawks)
Hiroshi Narahara (1990–2006 Seibu Lions→Nippon Ham Fighters→Chunichi Dragons)
Hiroshi Ogawa (1985–1992 Lotte Orions)
Yosuke Takasu (1998- Kintetsu Buffaloes→Rakuten Eagles)
Asia University
Daijiro Oishi (1981–1997 Kintetsu Buffaloes、2008–2009 Manager of Orix BlueWave)
Hideo Koike (1993–2005 Kintetsu Buffaloes→Chunichi Dragons etc.)
Hideyuki Awano (1987–2000 Kintetsu Buffaloes→Yomiuri Giants→Yokohama BayStars)
Hirokazu Ibata (1998- Chunichi Dragons)
Norihiro Akahoshi (2001- Hanshin Tigers)
Shingo Takatsu (1991- Yakult Swallows→Chicago White Sox→Tokyo Yakult Swallows)
Tetsuro Kawajiri (1995–2005 Hanshin Tigers→Osaka Kintetsu Buffaloes etc.)
Tsuyoshi Yoda (1990–2000 Chunichi Dragons→Chiba Lotte Marines→Nippon Ham Fighters)
Yusaku Iriki (1997–2008 Yomiuri Giants→Hokkaido Nippon Ham Fighters etc.)
Yutaka Ohashi (1969–1982 Toei Flyers→Hankyu Braves)
Chuo University
Yoshio Anabuki (1956–1968 Nankai Hawks、1983–1985 Manager of Nankai Hawks)
Shiro Mizunuma (1969–1983 Hiroshima Toyo Carp→Chunichi Dragons)
Shiro Takegami (1967–1975 Sankei Atoms、1980–1984 Manager of Yakult Swallows)
Toshimitsu Suetsugu (1965–1977 Yomiuri Giants)
Yutaka Takagi (1981–1994 Yokohama Taiyo Whales→Nippon Ham Fighters)
Junji Ogawa (1982–1994 Yakult Swallows、2011- Manager of Tokyo Yakult Swallows)
Shinnosuke Abe (2001- Yomiuri Giants)
Yoshiyuki Kamei (2005- Yomiuri Giants)
Yushi Aida (2006- Yomiuri Giants)
Hirokazu Sawamura (2011- Yomiuri Giants)
Hitotsubashi University
Takashi Kawamura (politician)
Kokugakuin University
Shunsuke Watanabe (2001- Chiba Lotte Marines)
Kokushikan University
Hiroshi Nagadomi (1986–2005 Hiroshima Toyo Carp→Nippon Ham Fighters→Fukuoka Daiei Hawks)
Shigeyuki Furuki (2002- Nippon Ham Fighters→Yomiuri Giants)
Komazawa University
Akihiko Ohya (1970–1985 Yakult Swallows、1996–1997,2007 Manager of Yokohama BayStars)
Hisanori Takahashi (2000- Yomiuri Giants)
Hiromichi Ishige (1981–1996 Seibu Lions→Fukuoka SoftBank Hawks)
Kenjiro Nomura (1989–2006 Hiroshima Toyo Carp、2010- Manager of Hiroshima Toyo Carp)
Koichi Sekikawa (1991–2007 Hanshin Tigers→Chunichi Dragons→Rakuten Eagles)
Kiyoshi Nakahata (1977–1989 Yomiuri Giants)
Takahiro Arai (1999- Hiroshima Toyo Carp→Hanshin Tigers)
Tsuyoshi Oshita (1967–1978 Nippon Ham Fighters→Hiroshima Toyo Carp)
Nihon University
Eiji Ochiai (1992–2006 Chunichi Dragons)
Hirotoshi Kitagawa (1995- Hanshin Tigers→Kintetsu Buffaloes→Orix Buffaloes)
Kenjiro Tamiya (1949–1963 Hanshin Tigers→Mainichi Orions)
Mitsuru Manaka (1993–2008 Yakult Swallows)
Naoyuki Shimizu (2000- Chiba Lotte Marines)
Shuichi Murata (2003- Yokohama BayStars)
Takehiko Bessho (1942–1961 Nankai Hawks→Yomiuri Giants)
Yoshinori Sato (1977–1998 Hankyu Braves, Orix BlueWave)
Yukinori Miyata (1962–1969 Yomiuri Giants)
Yutaka Wada (1985–2002 Hanshin Tigers)
Rissho University
Fumiya Nishiguchi (1995- Seibu Lions)
Senshu University
Hiroki Kuroda (1997- Hiroshima Toyo Carp)
Kento Sugiyama (1993–2001 Seibu Lions→Hanshin Tigers→Yokohama BayStars)
Takayoshi Nakao (1981–1993 Chunichi Dragons→Yomiuri Giants etc.)
Takeshi Koba (1958–1971 Hiroshima Toyo Carpetc、1975–1985 Manager of Hiroshima Toyo Carp、1987–1989 Manager of Taiyo Whales)
Yoichi Okabayashi (1991–2000 Yakult Swallows)
Shibaura Institute of Technology
Haruki Ihara (1971–1980 Nishitetsu Lionsetc、2002–2003 Manager of Seibu Lions、2004 Manager of Orix BlueWave)
Takushoku University
Ken Takahashi (1995- Hiroshima Toyo Carp)
Tokyo University of Agriculture
Shinsaku Katahira (1972–1989 Nankai Hawks→Seibu Lions etc.)
Takehiro Hashimoto (1990–2003 Fukuoka Daiei Hawks→Seibu Lions etc.)
Tsuneki Watanabe (2005- Rakuten Eagles)
Toyo University
Hiromitsu Ochiai (1979–1998 Lotte Orions→Chunichi Dragons→Yomiuri Giants→Nippon Ham Fighters、2004- Manager of Chunichi Dragons)
Mitsuo Tatsukawa (1978–1992 Hiroshima Toyo Carp、1999–2000 Manager of Hiroshima Toyo Carp)
Makoto Imaoka (1997- Hanshin Tigers)
Shinjiro Hiyama (1992- Hanshin Tigers)
Shinobu Fukuhara (1999- Hanshin Tigers)
Takayuki Shimizu (1996- Yomiuri Giants→2005- Seibu Lions)
Toru Nimura (1984–1997 Chunichi Dragons→Chiba Lotte Marines)

External links
Tohto University Baseball League

Baseball leagues in Japan
Sports leagues established in 1930
1930 establishments in Japan
College baseball